Tartu County ( or Tartumaa) is one of 15 counties of Estonia.

It is located in eastern Estonia bordering Põlva County, Valga County, Viljandi County and Jõgeva County.

In 2022 Tartu County had a population of 157,758 – constituting 11.9% of the total population in Estonia. Tartu County is divided into 8 local governments – 1 urban and 7 rural municipalities.

Geography 
Tartu County lies in South Estonia, between Lake Võrtsjärv and Lake Peipsi. Estonia's only navigable river, River Emajõgi (100 km long), flows through the county, connecting Lake Peipsi and Lake Võrtsjärv. Wavy plains are typical landscapes of Tartu County. One third of the county is covered with forests, a third is cultivated. A quarter is made up of wetlands at the headwaters and lower course of the Emajõgi. In the northern part of the county, there are drumlin fields with lakes between them. Nature reserves, such as Pähklisaar Nature Reserve, Emajõe Suursoo and Alam-Pedja take up about 10% of the county's territory.

History 
Archaeological findings suggest that people first inhabited the territory of the current Tartu County about 5000 years ago. City of Tartu was first mentioned in historical records in 1030, when Yaroslav I the Wise organized a military campaign against Chuds, defeated them and established fort Yuryev in what is modern day Tartu. In 1224, after the conquest of the stronghold by the German invaders, Tartu became the capital of a diocese, stretching from Northern Estonia to Latvia. Since the 13th century, Tartu belonged to the Hanseatic League, and the town became a well-known trade centre in the Baltic Sea region. In 1569, together with Duchy of Livonia, Tartu became part of the Polish–Lithuanian Commonwealth. In 1598 Tartu became capital of the Dorpat Voivodeship, which remained part of the PLC until the 1620s, when the city was conquered by the Swedes.

King Gustavus Adolphus of Sweden established the University of Tartu in 1632. Estonia's first teachers' training school was established in Tartu County in 1684, as well as the first Estonian schools for the children of peasants. Closed during and after the Great Northern War, Tartu University was re-opened in 1802 as the only university operating in German language in the Russian Empire. Economic development of the region was further encouraged by the construction of the railway connecting Tartu with Tallinn, Riga and St. Petersburg. In the second half of the 19th century, the national awakening of Estonians began from Tartu region. After Estonia gained independence in 1918, Tartu, along with Tallinn, became one of the two main cultural centres of Estonia, where most of the Estonian intelligentsia of the time lived and worked. In 1987–1989, the students' environmental and cultural heritage movement in Tartu initiated Estonia's Singing Revolution and restoration of the country's independence.

Economy
Tartu County is an integrated economic system and labour area with its centre in the City of Tartu.

There are 6000 companies and 2000 self-employed persons registered in Tartu County. More than 80% of the companies employ 10 or fewer people, only 5 companies in the whole region have more than 250 employees.

Service sector provides 2/3 of the employment in the county. The City of Tartu is the service and logistics centre for the whole of South Estonia. A significant part of these jobs are in the public sector – especially education and medicine – and the biggest employer in the county is Tartu University Clinics with around 3000 employees, incl 455 doctors. The biggest private sector employer is Tarmeko, producing furniture and components, with 900 employees. Unemployment rate in the county has been 2–3% in the recent years.

Typical products of Tartu County are furniture, foodstuffs, clothes, building materials, glass and plastics. The main export target countries are Finland, Germany, Latvia and Russia. 40% of the exports is wood and furniture, other export production includes machinery and appliances, building materials, glass and clothing. Thanks to the fertile lands, there are many big agricultural enterprises in the West of the county. Fishery is an important activity on the coast of Lake Peipsi.

There is development potential for knowledge intensive production in the region due to its universities. Some successful spin-offs of Tartu University are operating in the field of biotechnology and biomedicine. Since 2004, several ICT companies, orientated on the international markets, have been growing fast.

In order to facilitate innovation and technology transfer, Tartu Science Park is offering incubation and consultation services to research-based and high-tech oriented companies, and promoting cooperation between research institutions. Tartu University Institute of Technology is a research and development institution, which aims to facilitate the generation of new technological solutions. The R&D centres have been established in the areas of material and chemical technology, biomedical technology, environmental technology and information technology.

The key actors of the region have signed an agreement about the county's development strategy, which is economic and social development through increase of the knowledge input into production and services.

Economic development priorities:
Modernization of studying and working environment, technologies and methods in the schools and universities; internationalization of the universities; development of vocational and technical education;
support of entrepreneurship and start-ups, increase of knowledge input to the production;
improvement of living environment and social infrastructure of regional centres in the rural areas;
enhancement of international availability by roads, transport and communications networks.

Education and culture

Tartu County has 69 schools with approximately 23,000 pupils. 11 vocational schools provide practical training in 50 specialities. 40% of Estonia's students live and study in Tartu. In addition to the University of Tartu and the Estonian University of Life Sciences there are 9 other institutions of higher education, the most recent of them the Baltic Defence College.

In the City of Tartu, Estonia's oldest professional theatre, Vanemuine, stages drama, opera and ballet. In 1869 the first Estonian Song Festival was held in Tartu, starting a tradition of choral song festivals which are now held in Tallinn every 4 years with 15,000–30,000 participants. Today Tartu Song Festival arena hosts various open-air concerts in summer. There are over 30 museums and art galleries in Tartu County, including Tartu City Museum, Tartu Art Museum, Toy Museum, Estonian Sports and Olympic Museum, Estonian Postal Museum, Estonian Aviation Museum, Estonian Museum of Agriculture, Old-Believers' Museum of Living History, and others. Biggest and most important of them is Estonian National Museum, that was founded in 1909. Student festivals and Hanseatic festivals take place in Tartu regularly. The best known sports event hosted by Tartu County is the Tartu Ski Marathon, which is a member of the Worldloppet series.

Government 
In Estonia, there is no regional self-government on county level. The County Governments are led by County Governors, who are appointed by the National Government.

In accordance with the Government of the Republic Act , the County Governor represents interests of the state in the county and provides for integral and balanced development of the county. The County Governor co-ordinates co-operation of ministries and other organs of executive power located in a county with its local governments and performs supervision over the activities of the local governments. The County Governor is appointed for a five-year term by the Government of the Republic, on the basis of the Prime Minister's proposal and in co-ordination with the representatives of the local governments.

On February 2, 2006, Esta Tamm was appointed Tartu County Governor. She assumed office February 15, 2006.

The County Government manages the operations of and provides support services to the County Governor; prepares draft documents required by the County Governor; manages and controls the execution of orders of the County Governor; manages the preparation of draft budgets of state agencies administered by the County Government, and controls adherence to the budgets; manages relations of the County Governor with government agencies and local government agencies.

Municipalities 
The county is subdivided into municipalities. As of 2017, there is 1 urban municipality ( – "town") and 7 rural municipalities in Tartu County.

Religion

Gallery

References

External links 

 Tartu County – Official site
 City of Tartu
 Baltic Defence College, Tartu
 University of Tartu
 Estonian University of Life Sciences
 Tartu County Tourist Information

 
Counties of Estonia